The St. Seraphim Chapel, also known as the Old Church, is a historic Russian Orthodox church in Lower Kalskag, Alaska, United States, in Bethel Census Area, that may include a portion built in 1843, or it may have all been built later.  It was listed on the National Register of Historic Places in 1980.

The community has a 1975-built new church used for Russian Orthodox services; this is an old church that is either a later enlargement of an original church built probably in 1843 or it is wholly a later 1800s replacement.  The old church reflects the influence of traditional three-part Russian Orthodox ecclesiastical architecture in America expressed in the style of a log cabin.  Balanced in the center, it is divided into three parts: vestibule, nave, and altar chamber.  Each section is built by squared logs with corner dovetailing and straight butt joints at points where the logs are shorter.  A 1979 survey suggested that no other extant log church in Alaska (and perhaps nowhere else in all of North America) of its age possessed comparable construction.

See also
National Register of Historic Places listings in Bethel Census Area, Alaska

References 

1843 establishments in the Russian Empire
Buildings and structures in Bethel Census Area, Alaska
Churches completed in 1843
Churches on the National Register of Historic Places in Alaska
Russian Orthodox church buildings in Alaska
Buildings and structures on the National Register of Historic Places in Bethel Census Area, Alaska